Ülker Gençlik ve Spor Kulübü, commonly known as Ülker or Ülkerspor, was a Turkish professional basketball club that was based in Istanbul, Turkey. The club competed in the Turkish Basketball League. They played their home games at the Abdi İpekçi Arena.

History
Ülkerspor was founded in 1975, but its basketball department was created in 1993, by buying a Turkish Super League spot from Nasaş. The club have won four Turkish League titles in 1995, 1998, 2001, and 2006, with greats including Harun Erdenay, İbrahim Kutluay, Michael Anderson, Orhun Ene, Kevin Rankin, and more recently, Mirsad Türkcan and Serkan Erdoğan. The first major success for the club was in the 1995–96 FIBA European League when Ülker managed to reach the Quarterfinal Playoffs and was eliminated by FC Barcelona (the subsequent competition's finalist). Ülker also made the EuroLeague Top 16 for five consecutive seasons between 2002 and 2006, beating all the best European teams in the process, and showing it was an important team in the competition. Ülkerspor had its best finish when surviving a tough Top 16 group to make the Euroleague 2004–05 season Quarterfinal Playoffs, where it lost against CSKA Moscow. Ülkerspor also won five Turkish Presidential Cup titles and three Turkish Cup titles between 2001 and 2005. Things got serious again in the 2005–06 season, as Ülkerspor conquered its fourth Turkish League title.

In 2006, the Ülker corporation, which owned and sponsored the club, decided to abolish the team, converting it into the humble Alpella club, and to instead sponsor the Turkish club Fenerbahçe. Fenerbahçe then became known as Fenerbahçe Ülker.

Alpella played for two seasons in the Turkish Basketball League, in the 2006–07 and 2007–08 seasons. Finally, its league rights were bought by Trabzonspor, after the club was relegated down to the TB2L, following the 2007–08 season.

Notable players

Harun Erdenay  9 seasons: '94–'03
Orhun Ene  4 seasons: '93–'97
Mirsad Türkcan  1 season: '05–'06
İbrahim Kutluay  2 seasons: '03–'04, '05–'06
Ufuk Sarıca  2 seasons: '99–'01
Serkan Erdoğan  5 seasons: '00–'05 
Ömer Onan  1 season: '05–'06
Asım Pars  3 seasons: '96–'98, '01–'02 
Haluk Yıldırım  11 seasons: '93–'04
Kerem Tunçeri  1 season: '04–'05
Kerem Gönlüm  6 seasons: '99–'05
Ersan İlyasova  1 season: '04–'05

Tanoka Beard  1 season: '94–'95
Charles Shackleford  1 season: '95–'96
Thomas Jordan  1 season: '95–'96
Sean Higgins  1 season: '96–'97
Kevin Rankin  4 seasons: '96–'00
Michael Anderson  2 seasons: '97–'99
Jerome Allen  2 seasons: '99–'00
Mark Pope  1 season: '99–'00
Melvin Booker  2 seasons: '02–'04
Joseph Blair  2 seasons: '02–'04
Ashraf Amaya  1 season: '03–'04
Jeff Trepagnier  1 season: '05–'06
Marcus Haislip  1 season: '05–'06

Zaza Pachulia  4 seasons: '99–'03

Efthimios Rentzias  1 season: '03–'04

 Republic of Macedonia
Petar Naumoski  1 season: '03–'04

Roberts Štelmahers  1 season: '01–'02

Saulius Štombergas  1 season: '04–'05
Eurelijus Žukauskas  1 season: '04–'05
Virginijus Praškevičius  2 seasons: '02–'03, '04–'05

Honours

Domestic competitions
 Turkish Super League
 Winners (4): 1994–95, 1997–98, 2000–01, 2005–06 
 Runners-up (5): 1993–94, 1995–96, 2001–02, 2002–03, 2003–04
 Turkish Cup
 Winners (3): 2002–03, 2003–04, 2004–05 
 Runners-up (2): 1999–00, 2005–06
 Presidential Cup
 Winners (6): 1995, 2001, 2002, 2003, 2004, 2005 
 Runners-up (2): 1998, 2000

Other competitions
 FIBA International Christmas Tournament (defunct)
 Runners-up (1): 2003

See also
Alpella S.K.

References

External links
Ülkerspor Website
Eurobasket.com Team page
TBLStat.net Profile

Turkish Basketball Super League teams
Defunct basketball teams in Turkey
Basketball teams established in 1993
Basketball teams disestablished in 2006